Sweet Soul Music is the second studio album by the London Boys, a British dance pop duo. It was released in 1991 and reached number 22 in Austria. It did not chart in the UK, unlike the previous album The Twelve Commandments Of Dance. Five singles were released from this album: Chapel of Love, Freedom, Is This Love?, Sweet Soul Music, and Tonight! Tonight!.

Freedom peaked at #29 in Switzerland. The single Sweet Soul Music peaked at #11 in Austria.

Track listing
All tracks written by Ralf René Maué.

 Sweet Soul Music (3:32)
 Tonight! Tonight! (3:54)
 Freedom (3:58) UK #54
 Is This Love? (4:30)
 Bob Marley (4:27)
 Was?! (Just an Illusion) (4:33)
 Love Train (3:52)
 High Fidelity (3:57)
 Chapel of Love (3:37) UK #75
 Cherokee (3:46)
 Reggae-Reggae, Rasta-Rasta (Reprise Bob Marley) (2:49)

Chart performance

References

1991 albums
London Boys albums